The Pequot Fort was a fortified Native American village in what is now the Groton side of Mystic, Connecticut, United States.  Located atop a ridge overlooking the Mystic River, it was a palisaded settlement of the Pequot tribe until its destruction by Puritan and Mohegan forces in the 1637 Mystic massacre during the Pequot War.  The exact location of its archaeological remains is not certain, but it is commemorated by a small memorial at Pequot Avenue and Clift Street. The site previously included a statue of Major John Mason, who led the forces that destroyed the fort; it was removed in 1995 after protests by Pequot tribal members. The archaeological site was added to the National Register of Historic Places in 1990.

Description
The fort was located on top of Pequot Hill along Pequot Avenue just north of the village of West Mystic.  In the early 17th century, the Pequots were the largest and politically dominant tribe in what is now eastern Connecticut.  In the 1630s tensions rose over a variety of issues between the Pequots and their neighbors, among them the Narragansetts to the east, the Mohegans to the north, English settlers of the Connecticut and Saybrook colonies, and the Dutch colony of New Netherland.  The Pequot War broke out in 1636, after English trader John Oldham was found murdered on his boat near Block Island.  The Pequots were accused of sheltering the murderers, and one of their villages was burned by a Massachusetts Bay Colony force led by John Endecott.

The Pequots responded by making attacks on Saybrook and the Connecticut communities, to which the latter responded by organizing another expedition. Captain John Mason led 90 colonists and 100 Mohegan Indians, later augmented by a band of Narragansetts, against the Pequot fort at Mystic.  In the Mystic massacre on May 26, 1637, this force slaughtered 400 to 700 men, women and children of the Pequot Indian Tribe, and burned the fort. This action put the remaining Pequots to flight, and by the end of the war they had been destroyed as a viable polity.

In 1889 a statue of John Mason, designed by sculptor James C.G. Hamilton, was placed on Pequot Hill near the site where the massacre occurred.  The memorial included a plaque recalling Mason's role in leading the attack on the fort.  In the early 1990s, members of the Pequot tribe petitioned for the statue's removal, claiming offense at the commemoration of a killer of innocent people, and that its location was ground they considered sacred.  After several years of debate, the statue was moved to Windsor in 1996.  The circle where the statue previously stood is now home to what the Pequots consider a tree of life.

Archaeological site
Archaeological investigation of the summit area of Pequot Hill has yielded numerous Native American and early colonial artifacts, with features that are interpreted as a palisaded village.  The finds are consistent with post-destruction documentation of the site from the 17th to 19th centuries.

See also
National Register of Historic Places listings in New London County, Connecticut

References

Buildings and structures in New London County, Connecticut
Pequot War
Groton, Connecticut
Former Native American populated places in the United States
Forts on the National Register of Historic Places in Connecticut
National Register of Historic Places in New London County, Connecticut
Colonial forts in Connecticut
1637 establishments in North America